In Search of the Miraculous is the third studio album by London-based post punk band Desperate Journalist. It was released on 22 February 2019 through Fierce Panda Records.

Track listing

Charts

References

2019 albums
Desperate Journalist albums
Fierce Panda Records albums